Schinia ligeae is a moth of the family Noctuidae. It is found in North America, including Arizona, California, Nevada and Utah.

The larvae feed on Machaeranthera canescens and Xylorhiza tortifolia.

External links
Images
Butterflies and Moths of North America

Schinia
Moths of North America
Moths described in 1893